Roberto Garcìa Romero (20 February 1930 – 2 August 2002), better known as Roberto Cobo, was a Mexican actor. He appeared in more than eighty films between 1947 and 2002.

Partial filmography

References

External links 
 

1930 births
2002 deaths
Best Actor Ariel Award winners
Mexican male film actors
20th-century Mexican male actors
Male actors from Nuevo León